Patrick Alan "Pat" Takasugi (June 9, 1949 – November 6, 2011) was an American politician who served as a member of the Idaho House of Representatives for the 10A district from 2008 to 2011.

Early life and education 
Takasugi was born in Brigham City, Utah. After graduating from Vallivue High School, he earned a Bachelor of Arts degree in political science from the College of Idaho in 1971.

Career 
After graduation, then he enlisted in the United States Army. During his military service, he was assigned to an Airborne unit, the Rangers, and the Special Forces, was elevated to the rank of captain, and he fulfilled his duty actively until 1976 and served as a reservist in additional five years. Returned to Idaho, he ran a farm near Wilder and Homedale, and served as the director of the Idaho Department of Agriculture. Celia Gould, a fellow Republican, succeeded him as director. Takasugi was a George W. Bush delegate to the 2004 Republican National Convention.

Personal life 
Takasugi was a Japanese American. He and his wife, Suzanne Backe, had three children.

He died from pseudomyxoma peritonei, a rare form of appendix cancer, while in office. He is buried at the Wilder Cemetery. Senators Mike Crapo and Jim Risch delivered eulogies for him on the Senate floor.

References

External links 

1949 births
2011 deaths
American politicians of Japanese descent
Asian-American people in Idaho politics
American military personnel of Japanese descent
American farmers of Japanese descent
Deaths from cancer in Idaho
College of Idaho alumni
Deaths from appendiceal cancer
Farmers from Idaho
Republican Party members of the Idaho House of Representatives
Military personnel from Idaho
Military personnel from Utah
Members of the United States Army Special Forces
People from Brigham City, Utah
State agriculture commissioners in the United States
State cabinet secretaries of Idaho
United States Army officers
United States Army Rangers
United States Army reservists
Asian conservatism in the United States